Pot O'Luck (1942) was an American Thoroughbred racehorse bred and raced by the renowned Calumet Farm of Lexington, Kentucky. He was sired by Chance Play, the 1927 retrospective American Horse of the Year and 1935 Leading sire in North America. Out of the mare Potheen, his damsire was Wildair, winner of the 1920 Metropolitan Handicap.

1944
Trained by future U.S. Racing Hall of Fame inductee Ben Jones, racing at age two Pot O'Luck notably won the Champagne Stakes at New York's Belmont Park and the Pimlico Futurity at Baltimore's Pimlico Race Course.

1945
At three, Pot O'Luck won five of twenty-one starts and earned $149,220. He ran second to Hoop Jr. in the 1945 Kentucky Derby but won a number of important races that year including the 11/16 mile Ben Ali Stakes at Keenland Race Course, the 1¼ mile Arlington Classic Stakes, the Lawrence Realization Stakes and the Governor Bowie Handicap, both at 1⅝ miles, as well as the Jockey Club Gold Cup at two miles.

1946
Pot O'Luck bowed a tendon In the spring of 1946 that resulted in a year when he did not win a major race. He lost three races in a row until winning the July 15 Scintillator Purse at Arlington Park and in October won the Hop Creek Purse at Garden State Park Racetrack.

1947
In February 1947, five-year-old Pot O'Luck won the Cocoanuts Purse at Hialeah Park Race Track and in April earned his second win of the Ben Ali Stakes at Keenland Race Course. On June 13 it was announced that he had been sold to bloodstock agent John H. Clark who raced him without success until selling him in the fall to a Virginia breeding syndicate. A few years later Pot O'Luck was sold to a breeding operation in France but overall he met with little success as a sire. His best runner was Pot Hunter, a multiple stakes winner in Canada.

Pedigree

References

1942 racehorse births
Thoroughbred family 8-c
Racehorses bred in Kentucky
Racehorses trained in the United States
Godolphin Arabian sire line